Ernest Thurston Hall (May 10, 1882 – February 20, 1958) was an American film, stage and television actor.

Career

Stage
Hall toured with various New England stage companies during his teens, then went onto London, where he formed a small stage troupe.  He also toured New Zealand and South Africa."

At 22 in 1904, Hall was in the first stage production of Mrs. Wiggs of the Cabbage Patch. His Broadway credits include The Only Girl (1914), Have a Heart (1917), Civilian Clothes (1919), The French Doll (1922), Still Waters (1926), Buy, Buy, Baby (1926), Mixed Doubles (1927), Behold the Bridegroom (1927), The Common Sin (1928), Sign of the Leopard (1928), Security (1929), Fifty Million Frenchmen (1929), Everything's Jake (1930), Philip Goes Forth (1931), Chrysalis (1932), Thoroughbred (1933), Re-echo (1934), They Shall Not Die (1934), Spring Freshet (1934), All Rights Reserved (1934), and Rain from Heaven (1934).

In 1925, Hall took a troupe to Australia to perform the play So This Is London.

Film and television
Hall's film career began with his work in silent films in 1915. He appeared in 250 films between 1915 and 1957 and is remembered for his portrayal, during the later stages of his career, of often pompous or blustering authority figures. Early in his silent career, he supported Theda Bara in her vamp-costume dramas.

Hall's best-known television role was as Mr. Schuyler, the boss of Cosmo Topper (played by Leo G. Carroll), in the 1950s television series, Topper (1953–1956).

Personal life
Hall was married to Quenda Hackett at the time of his death.

Filmography

 The Mirror (1915, Short) - The Rival
 Cleopatra (1917) - Antony
 The Price Mark (1917) - Dr. Daniel Melfi
 Love Letters (1917) - John Harland
 Flare-Up Sal (1918) - The Red Rider
 An Alien Enemy (1918) - David J. Hale
 Tyrant Fear (1918) - Harley Dane
 The Mating of Marcella (1918) - Robert Underwood
 The Kaiser's Shadow (1918) - Hugo Wagner
 We Can't Have Everything (1918) - Peter Cheever
 The Brazen Beauty (1918) - Kenneth Hyde
 The Squaw Man (1918) - Henry, Jim's Cousin
 The Midnight Patrol (1918) - Officer Terrence Shannon
 Who Will Marry Me? (1919) - Jerome Van Tyne
 The Exquisite Thief (1919) - Algernon P. Smythe
 The Unpainted Woman (1919) - Martin O'Neill
 The Weaker Vessel (1919) - J. Booth Hunter
 The Spitfire of Seville (1919) - Kent Staunton
 Empty Arms (1920) - Bruce Gordon
 The Valley of Doubt (1920) - Jules
 Mother Eternal (1921) - Edward Stevens Sr
 Idle Hands (1921) - Henry Livingston
 The Iron Trail (1921) - Curtis Gordon
 Fair Lady (1922) - Italian banker
 Wildness of Youth (1922) - Edward Grayton
 The Royal Oak (1923) - Colonel Ancketell
 The Great Well (1924) - Peter Starling
 Hooray for Love (1935) - Commodore Jason Thatcher
 Love Me Forever (1935) - Maurizio
 The Black Room (1935) - Col. Paul Hassel
 After the Dance (1935) - District Attorney
 Atlantic Adventure (1935) - City Editor Rutherford (uncredited)
 The Public Menace (1935) - Captain of Ocean Liner
 The Girl Friend (1935) - George S. Harmon
 She Couldn't Take It (1935) - Party Guest (uncredited)
 Metropolitan (1935) - T. Simon Hunter
 The Case of the Missing Man (1935) - Boyle
 A Feather in Her Hat (1935) - Sir Elroyd Joyce
 Guard That Girl (1935) - Dr. Silas Hudson
 Crime and Punishment (1935) - Editor
 One Way Ticket (1935) - Mr. Ritchie
 Super-Speed (1935) - Investor
 Too Tough to Kill (1935) - Jim Whitney
 The Lone Wolf Returns (1935) - Inspector Crane
 Don't Gamble with Love (1936) - Martin Gage
 Pride of the Marines (1936) - Col. Gage
 Devil's Squadron (1936) - Major Metcalf
 Roaming Lady (1936) - E. J. Reid
 The King Steps Out (1936) - Major
 The Three Wise Guys (1936) - Hatcher
 Trapped by Television (1936) - John Curtis
 Shakedown (1936) - T. Gregory Stuart
 Two-Fisted Gentleman (1936) - Pop
 The Man Who Lived Twice (1936) - Dr. Clifford L. Schuyler
 Killer at Large (1936) - Inspector O'Hara
 Theodora Goes Wild (1936) - Arthur Stevenson
 Lady from Nowhere (1936) - James Gordon Barnes
 Don't Tell the Wife (1937) - Maj. Manning
 Women of Glamour (1937) - Mr. Stark
 Parole Racket (1937) - Jameson
 We Have Our Moments (1937) - Frank Rutherford
 Oh, Doctor (1937) - 'Doc' Erasmus Thurston
 I Promise to Pay (1937) - Police Captain Hall
 Venus Makes Trouble (1937) - Harlan Darrow
 It Can't Last Forever (1937) - Fulton
 Counsel for Crime (1937) - Sen. Maddox
 Murder in Greenwich Village (1937) - Charles Cabot
 Paid to Dance (1937) - State Governor
 All American Sweetheart (1937) - R.O. Davis (uncredited)
 Little Miss Roughneck (1938) - Joe Crowley
 Penitentiary (1938) - Judge (uncredited)
 No Time to Marry (1938) - Pettensall
 Women in Prison (1938) - Chairman of the Board (uncredited)
 There's Always a Woman (1938) - District Attorney
 Women Are Like That (1938) - Claudius King
 Extortion (1938) - Prof. Tisdelle
 Professor Beware (1938) - Mr. Van Buren
 The Main Event (1938) - Captain Phillips
 Squadron of Honor (1938) - Bob Metcalf
 Fast Company (1938) - Dist. Atty. MacMillen
 The Amazing Dr. Clitterhouse (1938) - Grant
 The Affairs of Annabel (1938) - Major
 Campus Confessions (1938) - Wayne Atterbury, Sr.
 Hard to Get (1938) - Atwater
 Spring Madness (1938) - Charles Platt (uncredited)
 Out West with the Hardys (1938) - H.R. Bruxton (uncredited)
 Going Places (1938) - Col. Withering
 You Can't Cheat an Honest Man (1939) - Mr. Bel-Goodie
 Three Smart Girls Grow Up (1939) - Senator (uncredited)
 Dodge City (1939) - Twitchell (uncredited)
 Ex-Champ (1939) - Mr. Courtney
 Million Dollar Legs (1939) - Gregory Melton Sr.
 Each Dawn I Die (1939) - Hanley
 Mutiny on the Blackhawk (1939) - Sam Bailey
 The Star Maker (1939) - Mr. Proctor
 Hawaiian Nights (1939) - T.C. Hartley
 The Day the Bookies Wept (1939) - Colonel March
 Dancing Co-Ed (1939) - H.W. Workman
 Sued for Libel (1939) - David Hastings
 Jeepers Creepers (1939) - M.K. Durant
 First Love (1939) - Anthony Drake
 Our Neighbors – The Carters (1939) - Mr. Guilfoyle
 Money to Burn (1939) - Ellis
 The Blue Bird (1940) - Father Time
 Blondie on a Budget (1940) - Brice
 Virginia City (1940) - Gen. George Meade (uncredited)
 Rancho Grande (1940) - John Dodge (voice, uncredited)
 In Old Missouri (1940) - John Pittman Sr.
 Alias the Deacon (1940) - Jim Cunningham
 The Lone Wolf Meets a Lady (1940) - Inspector M.L. Crane
 Millionaires in Prison (1940) - Harold Kellogg
 The Great McGinty (1940) - Mr. Maxwell
 The Golden Fleecing (1940) - Charles Engel
 City for Conquest (1940) - Max Leonard
 Life with Henry (1940) - Mr. Woodring (uncredited)
 Friendly Neighbors (1940) - The Governor
 The Lone Wolf Keeps a Date (1940) - Inspector Crane
 Kiddie Kure (1940, Our Gang short) - Bill 'Old Man' Morton
 The Invisible Woman (1940) - Hudson
 Where Did You Get That Girl? (1941) - Stuyvesant, Four Star Record Co. President
 Four Mothers (1941) - Mr. Davis (uncredited)
 Flight from Destiny (1941) - Dean Somers
 The Lone Wolf Takes a Chance (1941) - Inspector Crane
 Repent at Leisure (1941) - Jay Buckingham
 The Great Lie (1941) - Oscar Worthington James
 Washington Melodrama (1941) - Senator Morton
 She Knew All the Answers (1941) - J.D. Sutton
 In the Navy (1941) - Lead Senator (uncredited)
 Accent on Love (1941) - T.J. Triton
 Hold That Ghost (1941) - Alderman Birch (uncredited)
 Nine Lives Are Not Enough (1941) - H.S.Huntley (uncredited)
 Unexpected Uncle (1941) - Jerry Carter (uncredited)
 Swing It Soldier (1941) - Oscar Simms, Wheezies Sponsor
 Secrets of the Lone Wolf (1941) - Inspector Crane
 Tuxedo Junction (1941) - Doug Gordon
 Remember the Day (1941) - Gov. Teller
 Design for Scandal (1941) - Northcott
 Pacific Blackout (1941) - Williams - Civil Defense Official
 We Were Dancing (1942) - Senator Quimby (uncredited)
 Sleepytime Gal (1942) - Mr. Adams
 The Night Before the Divorce (1942) - Bert 'Mousey' Harriman
 Rings on Her Fingers (1942) - Mr. Harvey Beasley
 Shepherd of the Ozarks (1942) - James Maloney
 Hello, Annapolis (1942) - Capt. Wendall
 The Great Man's Lady (1942) - Mr. Sempler
 Twin Beds (1942) - Horace Touchstone (uncredited)
 Her Cardboard Lover (1942) - Mr. Garthwaite - Barling's Lawyer (uncredited)
 Call of the Canyon (1942) - Grantley B. Johnson
 Counter-Espionage (1942) - Inspector Crane
 The Great Gildersleeve (1942) - Governor John Stafford
 The Hard Way (1943) - Harry - Motion Picture Executive (uncredited)
 One Dangerous Night (1943) - Inspector Crane
 The Youngest Profession (1943) - Mr. Drew
 Sherlock Holmes in Washington (1943) - Senator Henry Babcock
 He Hired the Boss (1943) - Mr. Bates
 Crash Dive (1943) - Senator from Texas (uncredited)
 This Land Is Mine (1943) - Mayor Henry Manville
 Hoosier Holiday (1943) - Henry P. Fairchild
 I Dood It (1943) - Kenneth Lawlor
 Footlight Glamour (1943) - Randolph Wheeler (uncredited)
 Here Comes Elmer (1943) - P. J. Ellis
 Cover Girl (1944) - Tony Pastor (uncredited)
 Follow the Boys (1944) - Man (uncredited)
 The Adventures of Mark Twain (1944) - Politician (uncredited)
 Goodnight, Sweetheart (1944) - Judge James Rutherford
 The Great Moment (1944) - Senator Borland
 Wilson (1944) - Senator Edward H. 'Big Ed' Jones
 Song of Nevada (1944) - John Barrabee
 In Society (1944) - Mr. Van Cleve
 Ever Since Venus (1944) - Edgar Pomeroy
 Something for the Boys (1944) - Colonel Jefferson L. Calhoun (uncredited)
 Bring On the Girls (1945) - Rutledge
 Brewster's Millions (1945) - Colonel Drew
 Thrill of a Romance (1945) - J.P. Bancroft (uncredited)
 Don Juan Quilligan (1945) - First Judge
 Blonde from Brooklyn (1945) - 'Colonel' Hubert Farnsworth
 Lady on a Train (1945) - Josiah Waring
 The Gay Senorita (1945) - J.J. Frentiss
 West of the Pecos (1945) - Colonel Lambeth
 Song of the Prairie (1945) - Jerome Wingate
 Saratoga Trunk (1945) - Mr. Pound (uncredited)
 Colonel Effingham's Raid (1946) - Ed - the Mayor
 Two Sisters from Boston (1946) - Mr. Lawrence Tyburt Patterson Sr.
 Without Reservations (1946) - Baldwin
 One More Tomorrow (1946) - Thomas Rufus Collier II
 She Wrote the Book (1946) - Horace Van Cleve
 Dangerous Business (1946) - B.J. Calhoun
 Three Little Girls in Blue (1946) - Colonel Clay (uncredited)
 The Farmer's Daughter (1947) - Wilbur Johnson
 Welcome Stranger (1947) - Congressman Beeker
 Swing the Western Way (1947) - Jasper Jim Bandy
 The Secret Life of Walter Mitty (1947) - Bruce Pierce
 The Son of Rusty (1947) - Franklyn B. Gibson
 Black Gold (1947) - Colonel Caldwell
 The Unfinished Dance (1947) - Mr. Ronsell
 Mourning Becomes Electra (1947) - Dr. Blake
 It Had to Be You (1947) - Mr. Ned Harrington
 Three Daring Daughters (1948) - Howie Howard, Louise's Assistant (uncredited)
 King of the Gamblers (1948) - 'Pop' Morton
 Up in Central Park (1948) - Governor Motley
 Miraculous Journey (1948) - Kendricks
 Blondie's Secret (1948) - Mr. George Whiteside
 Rusty Saves a Life (1949) - Counsellor Frank A. Gibson
 Manhattan Angel (1949) - Everett H. Burton
 Stagecoach Kid (1949) - Peter Arnold
 The Fountainhead (1949) - Businessman at Party (uncredited)
 Rim of the Canyon (1949) - Big Tim Hanlon
 Square Dance Jubilee (1949) - G.K.
 Bride for Sale (1949) - Mr. Trisby (uncredited)
 Tell It to the Judge (1949) - Sen. Caswell (uncredited)
 Girls' School (1950) - Colonel Selby Matthews
 Belle of Old Mexico (1950) - Horatio Huntington
 Federal Agent at Large (1950) - 'Big Bill' Dixon
 Bright Leaf (1950) - Phillips
 Chain Gang (1950) - John McKelvey
 One Too Many (1950) - Kenneth Simes
 The Bandit Queen (1950) - Governor
 Belle Le Grand (1951) - Parkington
 Whirlwind (1951) - Big Jim Lassiter
 Texas Carnival (1951) - Mr. Gaytes
 One Big Affair (1952) - Mr. 'G'
 Night Stage to Galveston (1952) - Colonel James Bellamy
 Skirts Ahoy! (1952) - Thatcher Kinston
 Carson City (1952) - Charles Crocker
 It Grows on Trees (1952) - John Sleamish--Bank President (uncredited)
 Woman of the North Country (1952) - Mayor Spencer (uncredited)
 The WAC from Walla Walla (1952) - Col. Mayfield
 The Band Wagon (1953) - Colonel Tripp (uncredited)
 Wonder Valley (1953) 
 Affair in Reno (1956) - J.B. Del Monte
 The Go-Getter (1956) - Mr. Higgins

References

External links

 
 
 

1882 births
1958 deaths
American male film actors
American male silent film actors
American male stage actors
Male actors from Boston
20th-century American male actors
Burials at Forest Lawn Memorial Park (Hollywood Hills)